Surbiton High School is a private independent school in Surbiton in the Royal Borough of Kingston upon Thames, Greater London, England. It
has seven buildings overall including the Boys’ Preparatory School, Girls’ Preparatory School, the Senior School and the Sixth Form.

History

The school was founded in 1884 by a group of Anglican clergymen who instituted the Church Schools Company. Its objective was "to establish superior education for girls in accordance with the principles of the Church of England" wherever the need was felt.

Surbiton High is the founding member school of the Church Schools Company, now the United Church Schools Trust. It has seven sites in Surbiton: the Boys' Preparatory School (over two sites Charles Burney House and Avenue Elmers), the Girls' Preparatory School, Main Senior School, Surbiton Assembly Rooms, Mary Bennett House and the Sixth Form Centre, as well as sports grounds at Hinchley Wood and Oaken Lane.

The current principal of Surbiton High School is Rebecca Glover who took up post in January 2018. Surbiton High School takes female students from 4 years old to 18 years old, while the Boys' Preparatory School caters for 4 to 11 year olds.

Sport

Rowing
The school has a rowing club called the Surbiton High School Boat Club which is based on the River Thames at Trowlock Way, Off Broom Road, Teddington. The club is affiliated to British Rowing (Boat code SBT) and produced a junior national champion crew at the 2013 British Rowing Junior Championships.

Alumni

 Chemmy Alcott, Olympic skier
 Fran Balkwill OBE, scientist and author
 Muriel Box, The Rt. Hon. The Lady Gardiner, screenwriter and director
 Tina Cooper OBE, paediatrician
 Edwina Dunn OBE, entrepreneur
 Agnes Mary Field CBE, film producer and director
 Jane Hutt MS, Welsh Labour Party politician
 Mollie King, singer with The Saturdays
 Molly Mahood, literary scholar 
 Florence Macdonald Mayor, writer
 The Rt. Hon. Baroness Morgan of Cotes PC, former Conservative MP and minister
 Lucie Silvas, singer
 Kim Thomas, Olympic rower
 Nora S. Unwin, book illustrator
 Emma Wilson, academic and writer
 Dorothy Maud Wrinch, mathematician
 Elsie Zimmern, women's rights activist

References

External links

Surbiton High School website
Independent Schools Inspectorate 2015
Profile at the Good Schools Guide
Profile on the ISC website

1884 establishments in England
Educational institutions established in 1884
Church of England private schools in the Diocese of Southwark
Private co-educational schools in London
Private girls' schools in London
Private schools in the Royal Borough of Kingston upon Thames
Member schools of the Girls' Schools Association
Surbiton
United Learning schools
People educated at Surbiton High School
Preparatory schools in London